Mads Toppel (born 30 January 1982) is a Danish former professional footballer who played as a goalkeeper.

References

External links
 
 
 Toppel to B1909 
 Toppel to Randers
 Toppel to Næstved

Living people
1982 births
Footballers from Odense
Association football goalkeepers
Danish men's footballers
Denmark under-21 international footballers
Næsby Boldklub players
Odense Boldklub players
Randers FC players
Næstved Boldklub players
Tromsø IL players
Danish Superliga players
Eliteserien players
Danish expatriate men's footballers
Expatriate footballers in Norway
Danish expatriate sportspeople in Norway